Hypolaena is a plant genus in the family Restionaceae, described as a genus in 1810. The entire genus is endemic to Australia.

 Species
 Hypolaena caespitosa B.G.Briggs & L.A.S.Johnson  - WA
 Hypolaena exsulca R.Br.  - WA
 Hypolaena fastigiata R.Br. - Tassel Rope-rush  - WA, SA, NSW, Vic, Tas, Qld
 Hypolaena grandiuscula F.Muell.
 Hypolaena humilis (Gilg.) B.G.Briggs & L.A.S.Johnson  - WA
 Hypolaena pubescens (R.Br.) Nees - WA
 Hypolaena robusta Meney & Pate  - WA
 Hypolaena viridis B.G.Briggs & L.A.S.Johnson  - WA

 formerly included
A few dozen other species have been placed in the genus over the years but are now considered members of other genera: Anthochortus Calorophus Chordifex Desmocladus Empodisma Loxocarya Mastersiella Platycaulos Restio Stenotalis

References

Restionaceae
Poales genera
Endemic flora of Australia